Makedonia ( or ) is a form of the Greek folk dance Hasapiko that has evolved over the years to the patriotic song "Makedonia Xakousti" ( "Famous Macedonia"), unofficial anthem of the Greek region of Macedonia.

See also 
 Greek dances
 Suleiman Aga (dance)

Greek music
Macedonia (Greece)
Greek dances